KQCV-FM, known as the Bott Radio Network, is a Christian Teaching radio station serving the Oklahoma City, Oklahoma, area and is licensed to Community Broadcasting, Inc.

History
The station began broadcasting in 1998 with the call letters KQCV-FM.  It has been a member of The Bott Radio Network.

KQCV's programming is simulcast on translators K231BH 94.1 and K238AT 95.7, which both transmit with 250 watts from Northern Oklahoma City, K272FD 102.3, which transmit with 215 watts from South Oklahoma City, K223CG 92.5, which both transmit with 62 watts from Sands Springs, K229CQ 93.7, which transmit with 115 watts from Bartlesville, K227CI 93.3, which transmit with 99 watts from Ardmore, K293BO 106.5, which transmit with 170 watts from Lawton, K264BT 100.7, which transmit with 92 watts from Muskogee, and K260CV 99.9, which transmit with 250 watts from Stillwater.

External links
KQCV official website

QCV
QCV
Bott Radio Network stations